Sciadia is a genus of moths in the family Geometridae erected by Jacob Hübner in 1822.

Selected species
Sciadia dolomitica Huemer & Hausmann, 2009
Sciadia horridaria (Hübner, 1799)
Sciadia innuptaria (Herrich-Schäffer, 1852)
Sciadia septaria (Guenée, 1857)
Sciadia slovenica Leraut, 2008
Sciadia tenebraria (Esper, 1806) (=Sciadia torvaria (Hübner, 1813), Sciadia sabaudiensis Leraut, 2008)
Sciadia tenebraria wockearia (Staudinger, 1871)
Sciadia tenebraria taurusica Huemer & Hausmann, 2009

References

Boarmiini